Moko is a character in the mythology of Mangaia in the Cook Islands.

 Moko (dolphin), a male bottlenose dolphin that associated with New Zealanders from 2007 to 2010
 Moko, Burkina Faso, a village
 Moko drum, Asian bronze drums
 MOKO, a shopping mall in Grand Century Place, east Mong Kok, Hong Kong
 A banana disease caused by Ralstonia solanacearum

People
 Mokō (YouTuber) (Yutaka Baba), a Japanese YouTuber
 Nadiah Adu-Gyamfi, a British soul singer, previously known by the stage-name "Moko"
 Moko, a pen-name of Sidney Moko Mead, New Zealand author
 Peter Moko, a New Zealand rugby league footballer
 Pita Moko (1885–1943), a notable New Zealand land agent

See also
 Moko skink (Oligosoma moco), a species of skink in the family Scincidae